St Garmon's Church, Capel Garmon, is a redundant Anglican parish church in the village of Capel Garmon, Conwy, Wales.  
The church was restored and reseated in 1862–63 by the Lancaster architect E. G. Paley at a cost of £880 (equivalent to £ in ).  During the restoration, the south wall was rebuilt, windows were renewed and a porch and north vestry were added.  The seating was increased from 145 to 150.  The church consists of a single chamber.  The windows contain plate tracery.  Its exterior is partly rendered.  The church is now closed and, as of 2006, it was being used as a builder's store.

References

St Garmon's Church
Churches in Conwy County Borough
Former churches in Wales
Gothic Revival church buildings in Wales
19th-century Church in Wales church buildings
Capel Garmon
Churches completed in 1863
E. G. Paley buildings
1863 establishments in Wales